Pāora Taki (?–1897) was a notable New Zealand tribal leader and warrior. Of Māori descent, he identified with the Ngāi Tahu iwi.

References

1897 deaths
Ngāi Tahu people
New Zealand Māori soldiers
Year of birth unknown